Wang Changling (698–756) was a major Tang dynasty poet. His courtesy name was Shaobo. He was originally from Taiyuan in present-day Shanxi province, according to the editors of the Three Hundred Tang Poems, although other sources claim that he was actually from Jiangning near modern-day Nanjing. After passing the prestigious jinshi examination, he became a secretarial official and later held other imperial positions, including that of an official posting to Sishui, in what is currently Xingyang, in Henan province. Near the end of his life he was appointed as a minister of Jiangning county. He died in the An Lushan Rebellion; between the 10th month of the 14th year of the Tianbao era (755 CE) and the second year of the Zhide era (757 CE), he was executed by the Tang official Lü Qiuxiao (闾丘晓). When Lü later was sentenced to death by another official Zhang Hao (张镐), he pleaded for mercy, citing the fact that he had kin to take care of. Zhang's retort was, "Then, who's left to take care of Wang Changling's kin?". Lü went silent after that. 

He is best known for his poems describing fictional battles in the frontier regions of western China. He also wrote an homage to the Princess Pingyang, Lady Warrior of the early Tang Dynasty. Wang Changling was one of the competitors in the famous wine shop competition along with Gao Shi and Wang Zhihuan.

Notes

References
Rexroth, Kenneth (1970). Love and the Turning Year: One Hundred More Poems from the Chinese. New York: New Directions. 
Wu, John C. H. (1972). The Four Seasons of Tang Poetry. Rutland, Vermont: Charles E.Tuttle.

Further reading
 (Three Hundred Tang Poems), Taipei: , 2001.
 Varsano, Paula. "Whose Voice Is It Anyway? A Rereading of Wang Changling's 'Autumn in the Palace of Everlasting Faith: Five Poems". In Journal of Chinese Literature and Culture. Volume 3, issue 1 (April 2016), pp. 1-25.

External links
 
Books of the Quan Tangshi that include collected poems of Wang Changling at the Chinese Text Project:
Book 140
Book 141
Book 142
Book 143

Three Hundred Tang Poems poets
698 births
755 deaths
Politicians from Taiyuan
Poets from Shanxi
Tang dynasty politicians from Shanxi
8th-century Chinese poets
Chinese war casualties